"I'm Your Angel" is a duet by Celine Dion and R. Kelly from Dion's These Are Special Times album and Kelly's R. album. It was released on 13 October 1998. The song was written and produced by R. Kelly. The single was very successful, reaching number one in the United States and was certified platinum by the RIAA. The single also reached the top five in the United Kingdom and Ireland.

Commercial performance
The single was very successful in the United States and worldwide. It peaked at number one on the Billboard Hot 100 for six weeks. This was the first number one on Billboards new charting method of including airplay only tracks. The song remains both artists' latest U.S. number one single  to date. It spent also twelve weeks at number one on the Hot Adult Contemporary Tracks. The song also reached number one on the Hot 100 Singles Sales for six weeks and number 22 on the Billboard Hot 100 Airplay. The single also became a top 10 hit in various European countries, including the United Kingdom, Ireland, Switzerland, the Netherlands, and Sweden.

"I'm Your Angel" has sold over 1,550,000 copies in the United States alone and was certified platinum by the RIAA. In addition, the single was certified gold in Australia for 35,000 copies shipped and silver in the United Kingdom for 200,000 copies shipped.

The single was nominated at the 41st Annual Grammy Awards for Best Pop Collaboration with Vocals, but lost to "I Still Have That Other Girl", by Elvis Costello and Burt Bacharach.

The song was included later on Dion's greatest hits albums; All the Way... A Decade of Song and My Love: Essential Collection. It was also performed by her live during the Let's Talk About Love World Tour (included on the Au cœur du stade DVD) and the Taking Chances World Tour. "I'm Your Angel" appeared also on R. Kelly's compilation album, The R. in R&B Collection, Vol. 1 in 2003.

On 14 January 2019, following Lady Gaga’s removal of "Do What U Want", Dion, through her management, had the song on her own releases and its video pulled from streaming services due to renewed allegations of sexual misconduct and abuse against R. Kelly. However, the song remains on streaming services on R. Kelly's own releases.

Music video 
"I'm Your Angel" music video directed by Bille Woodruff, premiered on 19 October 1998. There are two versions: with or without both artists in the recording studio. The video without recording sessions was included on Dion's All the Way... A Decade of Song & Video DVD. R. Kelly's daughter Joann Kelly is featured in the video.

Critical reception
Chuck Taylor from Billboard praised "I'm Your Angel," a duet with R. Kelly. He wrote that "this wonderfully restrained ballad delights with the most graceful vocal performances either of these artists has ever offered to radio". Taylor commented, "what raises the roof is the tune's elegant, epic instrumental base, which includes sweeping strings, a soulful choir, and gentle but determined percussive drive". He continued, that "I'm Your Angel" "sells big at the bridge, where the instrumentation drops and Kelly and Dion harmonize in a gorgeous minor key – it truly makes the song". LAUNCH Yahoo wrote: "The ballad to beat all ballads is his duet with Celine Dion, "I'm Your Angel," which, were it not released the same week, could no doubt top the charts". Stephen Thomas Erlewine of AllMusic highlighted this song in R. album and called it "soaring ballad".

A mixed review came from EW editor Chris Willman: "Dion's earnest take on Vietnam-era Lennon is howler No. 1. No. 2 is her duet with R. Kelly, "I'm Your Angel," a slice of squishy-hearted pseudo gospel that might better be called "Touched by a Marketing VP". David Browne of EW wrote: "By the time R. winds up — with "I Believe I Can Fly" and "I'm Your Angel," a belt-by-numbers duet with Dion — Kelly has realized his crossover dream". Rob Sheffield of Rolling Stone wrote: "Every guest star who enters Kelly's parlor emerges better for the experience — even Celine Dion, the human anti-NAFTA petition whose dancing on the VH1 Divas special cried out for stricter work-visa controls".

Formats and track listings

Australian CD single
"I'm Your Angel" (Radio Version) – 4:49
"I Can't Sleep Baby (If I)" – 5:31
"Christmas Eve" – 4:16
"S'il suffisait d'aimer" – 3:35

European CD single
"I'm Your Angel" (Radio Version) – 4:49
"S'il suffisait d'aimer" – 3:35

European CD maxi-single
"I'm Your Angel" (Radio Version) – 4:49
"S'il suffisait d'aimer" – 3:35
"I Can't Sleep Baby (If I)" – 5:31

Japanese CD single
"I'm Your Angel" (Radio Version) – 4:49
"I Can't Sleep Baby (If I)" – 5:31
"Christmas Eve" – 4:16

UK cassette single
"I'm Your Angel" (Radio Version) – 4:49
"I Can't Sleep Baby (If I)" – 5:31
"Je crois toi" – 5:05

UK CD single
"I'm Your Angel" (Radio Version) – 4:49
"Je crois toi" – 5:05
"My Heart Will Go On" – 4:40

UK CD single #2 
"I'm Your Angel" (Radio Version) – 4:49
"I Can't Sleep Baby (If I)" – 5:31
"To Love You More" (Tony Moran I'll be Waiting... Vocal Mix) – 9:27

US CD single
"I'm Your Angel" (Album Version) – 5:31

Charts

Weekly charts

Year-end charts

Decade-end charts

Certifications and sales

Release history

See also

1998 in British music
Billboard Year-End Hot 100 singles of 1999
List of Billboard Hot 100 number-one singles of 1998
List of Billboard Hot 100 number-one singles of 1999
List of Billboard Hot 100 number-one singles of the 1990s
List of Billboard Hot 100 top 10 singles in 1998
List of Billboard Hot 100 top 10 singles in 1999
List of number-one adult contemporary singles of 1998 (U.S.)
List of number-one adult contemporary singles of 1999 (U.S.)
List of UK top 10 singles in 1998

References

External links
 

1998 singles
1998 songs
1990s ballads
American Christmas songs
Billboard Hot 100 number-one singles
Celine Dion songs
Contemporary R&B ballads
Epic Records singles
Jive Records singles
Music videos directed by Bille Woodruff
Pop ballads
R. Kelly songs
Songs written by R. Kelly
Soul ballads
Male–female vocal duets